Luke O'Shea is an Australian singer-songwriter and storyteller who has written, recorded and produced eight albums and won sixteen Golden Guitar Awards at the Country Music Awards of Australia, including three at the 2015 awards.

Discography

Studio albums

Awards and nominations

APRA AMCOS Song of the Year Awards
The APRA/AMCOS Song of theYear are presented annually from 1982 by the Australasian Performing Right Association (APRA), "honouring composers and songwriters". They commenced in 1982.

! 
|-
| 2013 
| "Drover's Wife" (Luke O’Shea and Peter Gabrielides)
| Song of the Year
| Finalist
|-
| 2014 
| "Lady Of The Land" (Luke O’Shea and Drew McAllister)
| Song of the Year
| Winner
|-
| 2015 
| "Three Brothers (The Great War)" (Luke O’Shea)
| Song of the Year
| Winner
|-
| 2017 
| "The Old Man's Shed" (Luke O’Shea and John Krsulja)
| Song of the Year
| Finalist
|-
| 2020 
| "Sing Me A Story" (Luke O’Shea and Felicity Urquhart)
| Song of the Year
| Finalist
|-
| 2021 
| "Happy Australia Day" (Luke O’Shea and Kevin Bennett)
| Song of the Year
| Finalist
|-
| 2023 
| "South East Queensland" (Luke O’Shea, Mitch Lynham and Fred Smith)
| Song of the Year
| Finalist
| 
|-

Country Music Awards of Australia
The Country Music Awards of Australia (CMAA) (also known as the Golden Guitar Awards) is an annual awards night held in January during the Tamworth Country Music Festival, celebrating recording excellence in the Australian country music industry. They have been held annually since 1973.

|-
| 2013
| "The Drovers Wife" by  Luke O'Shea 
| Heritage Song of the Year
| 
|-
| rowspan="2"| 2014
| rowspan="2"| "Lady of the Land" by  Luke O'Shea 
| Heritage Song of the Year
| 
|-
| APRA AMCOS Song of the Year
| 
|-
| rowspan="3"| 2015
| Sing You Up by  Luke O'Shea 
| Male Artist of the Year
| 
|-
| rowspan="2"| "Three Brothers (The Great War)" by  Luke O'Shea 
| Heritage Song of the Year
| 
|-
| APRA Song of the Year
| 
|-
| 2017
| "The Old Man's Shed" by  Luke O'Shea 
| Heritage Song of the Year
| 
|-
| rowspan="2"| 2018
| rowspan="2"| "Never Never Land" by Tom Curtain feat Luke O'Shea 
| Heritage Song of the Year
| 
|-
| Video Clip of the Year
| 
|-
| rowspan="2"| 2020
| rowspan="2"| "Sing Me a Story" by Luke O'Shea & Lyn Bowtell
| Vocal Collaboration of the Year
| 
|-
| Heritage Song of the Year
| 
|-
| rowspan="2"| 2021
| There in Ochre
| Traditional Country Album of the Year
| 
|-
| "Happy Australia Day"
| Heritage Song of the Year
| 
|-
| rowspan="2"| 2022
| rowspan="2"| "Long Way 'Round"
|-
| CMT Video of the Year
| 
|-
| rowspan="2"| 2023
| rowspan="2"| "South East Queensland"
| Heritage Song of the Year
| 
|-
| CMT Video of the Year
| 
|-

 Note: wins only

References

Australian country singers
21st-century Australian singers
21st-century Australian male singers
Living people
Year of birth missing (living people)